Félicien-César David (13 April 1810 – 29 August 1876) was a French composer.

Biography
Félicien David was born in Cadenet, and began to study music at the age of five under his father, whose death when the boy was six left him an impoverished orphan. His good voice enabled him to study as a choirboy at the Cathedral of Saint-Sauveur in Aix-en-Provence, which he left at the age of 15 with a sound knowledge of music, and a scholarship which enabled him to study literature at a Jesuit college. However, after three years, he abandoned these studies to pursue a musical career.

He first obtained a position in the orchestra of the theatre at Aix. In 1829, he became maître de chapelle at Saint-Sauveur, but realised that to complete his musical education he needed to study at Paris. An allowance of 50 francs per month from a rich uncle made this possible.

In Paris in 1830 he convinced Luigi Cherubini, the director of the Conservatoire, to enroll him as a pupil: despite his reservations, Cherubini recognised the talent shown by David's  choral setting of Beatus vir. Despite the sudden withdrawal of his uncle's subsidy, David's studies, with Fétis and others, continued successfully.

On leaving the Conservatoire, David was caught up in the Saint-Simonian movement, for which he became a great enthusiast. The Saint-Simonians held music to be an important art, and David wrote much music for them, including a number of hymns. After the suppression of the movement in 1832, David joined with a number of adepts who visited the Middle East. This also proved a source of strong inspiration, leading eventually to his greatest success, the symphonic ode Le désert of 1844.

Returning to Paris in 1833, he wrote a number of romances, and instrumental music including three symphonies (in F major, E major and C minor, composed in 1837, 1838 and 1849); by 1838/39 he was successful enough to be able to arrange public performances of his works. With Le désert he was acknowledged by the public and the critics as a significant force. The Revue et gazette musicale announced, the morning after its premiere, "A great composer has been born amongst us". To relieve his substantial debts, however, the composer sold the rights to his masterpiece for a relatively small sum.

David wrote a number of operas, of which the most notable are  Christophe Colomb (1847), La perle du Brésil (1851), Herculanum (1859), and Lalla-Roukh (1862). Amongst his oratorios are Moïse au Sinaï ('Moses on Sinai') (1846), and Eden (1848).

David became a member of the Légion d'honneur in 1862 and was given a civil pension. On the death of Berlioz in 1869, he took his place in the Institut de France. He died in Le Pecq (now Saint-Germain-en-Laye) in the département Yvelines, close to Paris, in 1876.

Works

Instrumental
 Piano trio no. 1 in E major
 Piano trio no. 2 in D minor 
 Piano trio no. 3 in C minor
 Four string quartets
 Les Quatre Saisons: Soirées de Printemps / d'Été / d'Automne / d'Hiver (string quintet: two violins, viola, cello, double-bass)
 Nonet for brass in C minor, 1839 (4 horns, 2 trumpets, 2 trombones, tuba)
 Solo piano: Pensée (mélodie-valse), L'Absence (romance sans paroles), Rêverie, Le Soir (rêverie)
 4 symphonies (for orchestra) (1837-1849)

Vocal
 Le désert (Ode-symphonie)
 Christoph Colomb (Ode-symphonie)
 Moïse au Sinaï, oratorio 
 Eden, oratorio

 La Perle du Brésil, opéra comique in three acts (22 November 1851, Paris)
 Herculanum, opéra in four acts (4 March 1859, Paris)
 Lalla-Roukh, opéra comique in two acts (12 May 1862, Paris)
 Le Saphir, opéra comique in three acts (8 March 1865, Paris) on a libretto by Michel Carré, Adolphe de Leuven and Térence Hadot (18..-18..)
 La Captive, opéra comique in three acts (1883, Paris)
 Motets Pie Jesu / Miseremini / Alma redemptoris Mater (for Aix cathedral choir), O salutaris

References

David, Félicien-César, 1810-1876 Biography and list of compositions from Musicology.org (in French).
This article is based on the article on Félicien David in French Wikipedia.

External links
 
 
 
 David's Piano Trio in E-flat Major Score and Parts from Sibley Music Library Digital Scores Collection
 David Piano Trio Nos. 2 and 3, sound-bites, discussion of works, short biography and sheet music
 Maison de la lirique cds and DVDs lyric opera collection

1810 births
1876 deaths
19th-century classical composers
19th-century French composers
Conservatoire de Paris alumni
French male classical composers
French opera composers
Male opera composers
French Romantic composers
Recipients of the Legion of Honour
Members of the Académie des beaux-arts
People from Aix-en-Provence
People from Vaucluse
Saint-Simonists
19th-century French male musicians